Manado-Bitung Toll Road is a toll road that connects Manado and Bitung,  two largest cities of North Sulawesi province in the island of Sulawesi, Indonesia. This toll road serves as the main access road to Bitung Special Economic Zone (SEZ) and Bitung International Hub Port. 

This toll road is expected to boost economic growth in Manado, North Minahasa, and Bitung. This toll road will also boost tourism as it will enable easy accessibility to various tourist attractions in Sulawesi including the Rumah Alam Manado Adventure Park, Kima Atas waterfall, Lembeh Mangrove forest, Tangkoko National Park, Gunung Dua Saudara, and other beaches.

The toll road was inaugurated by President Joko Widodo on 25
February, 2022 after completion of all sections

Sections
This toll road is divided into four sections, namely 
Section 1A (Manado-Sukur Ring Road) is 7.9 km
Section 1B (Sukur-Air Madidi) is 7 km
Section 2A (Airmadidi-Danowudu) is 11.5 km
Section 2B (Danowudu-Bitung) is 13.5 km

Toll gates

See also

Transport in Indonesia

References

Toll roads in Indonesia
Transport in North Sulawesi
Transport in Sulawesi